Ali ibn Muhammad al-Hadi (828 – 868 CE) was a descendant of the Islamic prophet Muhammad and the tenth of the Twelve Imams, succeeding his father, Muhammad al-Jawad. He is known with the titles al-Hadi and al-Naqi. As with most of his predecessors, he kept aloof from politics in Medina, until he was summoned around 848 CE to the capital Samarra by the Abbasid caliph al-Mutawakkil, known for his hostility towards Shia. There he was held under close surveillance until his death in 868 CE during the caliphate of the Abbasid al-Mu'tazz, but still managed to communicate with an underground network of representatives who organized the financial and religious affairs of Imamite Shias on his behalf. Most Shia sources hold the Abbasids responsible for his death at the age of about forty through poison, though an exception is al-Shaykh al-Mufid. The majority of his followers then accepted the imamate of his son Hasan, who was also detained in Samarra until his unexplained death a few years later. A sacred site for Shia pilgrims, the al-Askari shrine in Samarra houses the tombs of al-Hadi and his successor, and has been targeted by Sunni militants, as recently as 2007. The restricted life of al-Hadi in Samarra marks the end of the direct leadership of the Shia community by the Imams. A theological treatise on free will and some other short texts are ascribed to al-Hadi.

Titles 
Ali ibn Muhammad, the tenth of the Twelve Imams, was known by the titles al-Hadi and al-Naqi. He was also known as al-Mutawakkil, according to the Islamicist Shona F. Wardrop, who adds that this title was rarely used to avoid confusion with the Abbasid caliph al-Mutawakkil. In view of their restricted life in the garrison town of Samarra under Abbasid surveillance, Ali and his son Hasan share the title al-Askari. Ali al-Hadi is also cited in the Shia hadith literature as Abu al-Ḥasan al-Thalith, so as to distinguish him from his predecessors, namely, Musa al-Kazim and Ali al-Rida, the seventh and the eighth of the Twelve Imams, respectively. These two are cited in Shia sources as Abu al-Hasan, the first, and Abu al-Hasan, the second, respectively.

Life

Birth
Ali al-Hadi was born on 16 Dhu al-Hijja 212 AH (7 March 828 CE) in Sorayya, a village near Medina founded by his great-grandfather, Musa al-Kazim. There are also other given dates in the window of Dhu al-Hijja 212 AH (March 828 CE) to Dhu al-Hijja 214 AH (February 830 CE), though these alternatives might be less reliable. It is also 15 Dhu al-Hijja that is annually celebrated by Shias for this occasion. Ali al-Hadi was the son of Muhammad al-Jawad, the ninth of the Twelve Imams, and his mother was Samana (or Susan), a freed slave of Maghrebi origin. The historian Teresa Bernheimer considers it possible that Ali was instead born to Umm al-Fadl, a daughter of the Abbasid caliph al-Ma'mun, though this marriage is often considered without an issue. As for his birthplace, the Shia-leaning historian al-Mas'udi differs from the prevalent view. He writes in his  that Ali was first taken to Medina sometime after 215 AH, when al-Jawad and his family left Iraq to perform Hajj.  is an early collective biography of the Shia Imams, but its attribution to al-Mas'udi is not certain.

Reign of al-Mu'tasim

Ali al-Hadi lived in Medina in this period. Probably summoned by al-Mu'tasim, his father al-Jawad and his wife traveled to the Abbasid capital Baghdad in 220 AH (835 CE), leaving Ali behind in Medina. Muhammad al-Jawad died in Baghdad in the same year, at the age of about twenty-five. During this short window, Shia sources accuse al-Mu'tasim of multiple attempts to discredit al-Jawad and finally murdering him by poison, while Sunni sources are silent about the cause of his death. Ali al-Hadi was thus about seven years old when his father died. The latter source is another early collective biography of Shia Imams, often attributed to the Twelver author Ibn Jarir ibn Rustam al-Tabari. After the death of his father, the young Ali was likely kept under the guardianship of caretakers hostile to the Shia cause. This was to isolate Ali from Shias, to the point that  reports that he was kept under house arrest. The account in  also describes how al-Junaydi was so impressed with the knowledge of the child that he eventually became a Shia. The exceptional innate knowledge of the young Ali is also claimed by the prominent Twelver theologian al-Shaykh al-Mofid in his biographical , which is considered reliable by most Shias. The Islamicist Matthew Pierce draws parallels here with the Hebrew Psalms, Christian gospels, and the Quran, particularly the Quranic verse 3:46 about Jesus, "He will speak to people in the cradle."

Reign of al-Wathiq 
Ali al-Hadi emerged from isolation with the ascension of the less-hostile al-Wathiq in 227 AH (842 CE), who had earlier led the funeral prayer for al-Jawad. The Shia community was relatively free in this period, and Alids received stipends, according to the early historian Abu al-Faraj al-Isfahani. Alids are the descendants of Ali ibn Abi Talib, cousin and son-in-law of the Islamic prophet Muhammad. An Alid himself, Ali al-Hadi was also less restricted in this period. He engaged in teaching in Medina after reaching adulthood, possibly attracting a large number of students from Iraq, Persia, and Egypt, where the House of Muhammad traditionally found the most support. An account by Ibrahim ibn Mahziyar al-Ahwazi describes a visit to Ali al-Hadi in 228 AH (842-3 CE) to deliver some goods, accompanied by his brother Ali, who was himself a trusted associate of al-Jawad. The understanding of Wardrop is that the young Ali thus began to renew links with the loyal followers of his father, al-Jawad. Within five years of this meeting, Ali al-Hadi was in contact with representatives from several regions. Khayran tells him that al-Wathiq is dying, adding that the general view is that he would be succeeded by his son. Ali, however, correctly predicts the ascension of Ja'far al-Mutawakkil. This account is given a miraculous aspect in some sources, although it might simply show the political awareness of Ali al-Hadi.

Reign of al-Mutawakkil 
Partly due to renewed Zaydite Shia opposition, al-Mutawakkil persecuted Mu'tazilites and Shias, to the point that even Sunni sources have noted his hostility towards Shias. The caliph is said to have imposed the penalty of death by flagellation on anyone who insulted the companions or the wives of the prophet. He openly cursed Ali ibn Ali Talib, the first Shia Imam, and ordered a clown to ridicule Ali in his banquets, writes the Twelver scholar Muhammad H. Tabatabai. By his orders, the shrine of Ali's son, Husayn, was demolished in Karbala, water was turned upon the tomb, and the ground was plowed and cultivated to remove any trace of the tomb, so as to stop Shia pilgrimages to the site, which he also outlawed. His campaign of arrests and torture in 232 AH (846 CE) led to the deaths of some associates of Ali al-Hadi in Baghdad, al-Mada'in, Kufa, and Sawad. These were replaced by new representatives, including Hasan ibn Rashid and Ayyub ibn Nuh. The anti-Shia policies of al-Mutawakkil also pushed many Alids in Hejaz and Egypt into destitute. The caliph is said to have punished those who traded with the Alids, thus isolating them financially. Earlier returned to the Alids by al-Ma'mun, Fadak was now confiscated by al-Mutawakkil and awarded to a descendant of the early caliph Umar, named Abd-Allah ibn Umar al-Bazyar. The caliph also dismissed officials suspected of Shia sympathy, including Ishaq ibn Ibrahim, the governor of Saymara and Sirawan in the province of al-Jabal. As the governor of the holy cities in Hejaz, al-Mutawakkil appointed Umar ibn Faraj, who prevented Alids from answering to religious inquiries or accepting charitable gifts, thus pushing them into poverty. The caliph also created a new army, known as Shakiriyya, which recruited from anti-Alid areas, such as Syria, al-Jazira, al-Jabal, Hejaz, and Abna. He implemented these anti-Alid policies with the help of his officials, particularly al-Jarjar'ai and al-Fath ibn Khaqan.

Summoned to Samarra 
It was during the caliphate of al-Mutawakkil that the governor of Medina, Abd-Allah ibn Moḥammad, wrote to the caliph and warned him about the subversive activities of al-Hadi, claiming that he had concealed arms and books for his followers. Abd-Allah is elsewhere introduced as the official in charge of both prayer and war in Medina, while  attributes the affair to Burahya al-Abbasi, the leader of prayers in Medina, who may have advised the caliph to remove al-Hadi from the city because he was allegedly agitating against the caliph. When al-Hadi learned about the allegations, he also wrote to al-Mutawakkil and defended himself. In response, the caliph assured al-Hadi of his highest regard for him but requested that he with his family relocate to the new Abbasid capital Samarra, a garrison town where the Turkish guards were stationed, not far from Baghdad. The latter source is a comprehensive collection of Shia hadiths by the prominent Twelver scholar Muhammad ibn Ya'qub al-Kulayni. The Islamicist Wilferd Madelung suggests that the attribution of the letter to the caliph is correct, while Wardrop views the reverential and conciliatory tone of the letter as an indication that the caliph was cautious not to provoke an Alid rebellion in Medina, even though there is no evidence that al-Hadi actually intended to revolt. In contrast, the Muslim scholar Jassim M. Hussain suggests that al-Hadi was summoned to Samarra and held there because the investigations of caliph's officials, including Abd-Allah, had uncovered connections between the Shia Imam and the underground activities of the Imamites in Baghdad, al-Mada'in, and Kufa. The caliph then decided to follow the policy of al-Ma'mun, who had attached al-Rida and al-Jawad to his court in order to monitor and restrict them. The escort who accompanied al-Hadi to Samarra is named variously in different sources as Yahya ibn Harthama, Yahya ibn Hubayra, or Attab ibn Abi Attab. The account of al-Mas'udi adds that this escort searched the residence of al-Hadi in Medina, without finding any evidence of subversion. He also calmed the public disorder by ensuring the locals that al-Hadi would not be harmed. A similar account is given by the Sunni historian Ibn Khallikan.

Life in the Abbasid court 
When al-Hadi approached Baghdad, people gathered to see him and he was received warmly by the governor who rode out of the city to welcome him. When al-Hadi arrived in Samarra on 23 Ramadan 233 AH (1 May 848 CE), the caliph did not immediately receive him but assigned a house for his residence, located in the al-Askar quarter of the city, which was chiefly occupied by the army. More specifically, his residence was in the center of the city on Shari' Abi Ahmad. Having escorted al-Hadi to Samarra, Yahya conveyed to the caliph the recommendations of Ishaq ibn Ibrahim al-Tahiri, the governor of Baghdad, and the Turk Wasif, which apparently convinced the caliph to treat al-Hadi honorably. Still, there is a report that al-Hadi was temporarily placed under house arrest after his arrival in Samarra.  

Ali al-Hadi lived in Samarra under constant surveillance until his death, some twenty years later. Among modern authors, Edward D. A. Hulmes, Moojan Momen, Hamid Mavani, and Reza Aslan liken al-Hadi to a prisoner in this period. In particular, he could rarely meet with ordinary Shias, as suggested by the scarcity of such reports in the early sources. For instance,  describes a group of eager visitors for al-Hadi who nevertheless had no idea what their imam looked like. The reports about this period depict a persecuted al-Hadi who suffered frequent attempts by al-Mutawakkil and some others at the court to belittle and dishonor him. More seriously, there is some evidence that al-Mutawakkil at least once attempted to kill al-Hadi during this period. Tabatabai and the Muslim scholar Abdulaziz Sachedina go further and write that the caliph on multiple occasions was intent on killing al-Hadi and had his house searched. Sachedina believes that fear of public unrest prevented al-Mutawakkil from killing al-Hadi, who by this time was recognized by the public as a pious and learned figure. In contrast, Madelung quotes al-Hadi as saying that he had not come to Samarra voluntarily but would never leave the city, as he liked the quality of its water and air. His view is that al-Hadi was allowed to move freely within the city, and continued to send (written) instructions for his representatives across the Abbasid empire and receive through them the donations of Shias. That al-Hadi remained in contact with his followers is also the opinion of the Islamicists Farhad Daftary, Sachedina, and Hussain. In particular, Sachedina views this freedom to communicate as an indication that the Abbasids did not find al-Hadi to be a serious threat, while Hussain believes that al-Hadi sent and received his messages with secrecy, and that the caliph had his house searched for any evidence of seditious activities. Unlike Sachedina, Wardrop suggests that the passive spiritual excellence of the Shia Imams was probably considered a more serious threat compared to an armed rebellion which could be easily crushed. For Wardrop, a cycle of honor and suspicion was inevitable at the court of al-Mutawakkil. Still, in the case of al-Hadi as a Shia Imam with an active following, the image offered by the sources is heavily tilted towards suspicion and persecution. Wardrop also notes that most reports about al-Hadi are attributed to this period, perhaps because al-Hadi was more 'newsworthy' in Samarra, being close both to the center of power and to the large Shia population in Iraq. While many of these reports might be exaggerated, they are likely based on truth and unwise to ignore in her view. 

Wardrop studies a few representative accounts about al-Hadi in this period:  reports that al-Mutawakkil ordered to search the residence of al-Hadi at night on a tip by al-Batha'i, an Alid supporter of the caliph. The search did not turn any evidence of subversive activities and the money seized was later returned to al-Hadi. After the search, a relieved al-Mutawakkil invited al-Hadi to drink wine with him late at night. The latter refused and instead recited some poetry, the moral theme of which moved the caliph to tears. Shortly before the overthrow of al-Mutawakkil in 247 AH (861 CE),  by the Twelver historian Shaykh al-Tabarsi and  mention temporary imprisonment of al-Hadi under the custody of one Ali ibn Karkar. The caliph might have ordered his close advisor Ibn Khaqan to poison al-Hadi on this occasion. Also in 247 AH (861 CE), the biographical  by the Twelver scholar Qutb al-Din al-Rawandi reports a house arrest of al-Hadi under Sa'id al-Hajib, who was allegedly ordered to kill the Imam. On this occasion, a visitor finds al-Hadi seated next to an open grave in his house but is reassured by him that he would be not be harmed because al-Mutawakkil would die shortly.  reports that the prayer of al-Hadi in the palace was once interrupted by someone who accused him of hypocrisy. In a banquet he was invited to, al-Hadi silenced a man who continued to loudly interrupt him by telling him that his death was imminent, reports . A report on the authority of Zurara, a member of the court, states that the caliph offered a reward to anyone who would embarrass al-Hadi. The offer was picked up by an Indian knowledgable of various sleights of hand, the report continues, who arranged for the loaves of bread to move away when al-Hadi reached for them, bringing the crowd to laughter.  reports that al-Mutawakkil temporarily forbade his staff from serving al-Hadi, advised by a relative nicknamed Harisa, who warned the caliph about the good name of al-Hadi in the court. The report has a miraculous ending with the caliph abandoning his policy after an unexpected breeze blew the curtains open for al-Hadi instead of the guards.

Reigns of al-Muntasir, al-Musta'in, and al-Mu'tazz 
Ali al-Hadi continued to live in Samarra after the assassination of al-Mutawakkil in 247 AH (861 CE), through the short reign of al-Muntasir, followed by four years of al-Musta'in, and until his death in 254 AH (868 CE) during the caliphate of al-Mu'tazz. In particular, al-Muntasir and al-Musta'in somewhat relaxed the anti-Alid policies of al-Mutawakkil, and al-Hadi thus lived more freely in those years. For instance, al-Muntasir apparently returned Fadak to the Alids and allowed them to visit the tomb of Husayn. Still, under al-Musta'in, his governor of Egypt arrested Ibn Abi Hudra, an Alid leader, and deported him and his supporters to Iraq in 248 AH (862 CE), according to the Sunni historian Muhammad ibn Yusuf al-Kindi. Also in Egypt, Muhammad ibn Hajar was killed and the estate of Saif ibn al-Layth was confiscated by the ruler, according to al-Kulayni. Both men were followers of al-Hadi. Elsewhere, some supporters of al-Hadi were arrested in Samarra, while his main agent in Kufa, named Ayyub ibn Nuh, was prosecuted by the local judge. Hussain writes that Alid revolts broke out in 250-1 AH (864-5 CE) in Kufa, Tabaristan, Rayy, Qazvin, Egypt, and Hejaz. He adds that the rebel leader in Mecca was an Imamite named Muhammad ibn Ma'ruf al-Hilali, while the Kufan rebel leader Yahya ibn Umar was praised by an agent of al-Hadi, named Abu Hashim al-Ja'fari. Later under al-Mu'tazz, the Abbasids discovered connections between some rebels in Tabaristan and Rayy and some Imamite figures close to al-Hadi, who were thus arrested in Baghdad and deported to Samarra. These included Muhammad ibn Ali al-Attar, Abu Hashim al-Ja'fari, and apparently the two sons of al-Hadi, namely, Hasan and Ja'far. More such connections to al-Hadi are listed by the Sunni historian al-Tabari. Hussain suggests that all this paved the way for the murder of al-Hadi by the Abbasids during the reign of al-Mu'tazz. It is also the view of Sachedina that the restrictions on al-Hadi were renewed under al-Mu'tazz, who is indeed viewed responsible in Shia sources for the murder of al-Hadi by poison.

Death 

According to al-Tabari and al-Kulayni, al-Hadi died on 26 Jumada al-Thani 254 AH (21 June 868 CE) at the age of about forty and during the caliphate of al-Mu'tazz. Other given dates fall in Jumada al-Thani and Rajab 254 AH (June-July 868 CE). In particular, 3 Rajab is annually commemorated by Shias for this occasion. Most Shia authors record that he was poisoned by the Abbasids. The exceptions are al-Mufid, who is silent about the cause of death of al-Hadi, the Shia-leaning historian al-Ya'qubi, who writes that he died mysteriously, and al-Isfahani, who does not list al-Hadi among the Alid martyrs in his . Among modern authors, Tabatabai holds that al-Hadi was poisoned by the order of al-Mu'tazz, while Hussain implies that the murder of al-Hadi was related to the Abbasids discovering his connections to the Shia revolts against al-Mu'tazz. In contrast, Momen says that the real power was in the hands of the Turkish generals by the time al-Hadi died and he, therefore, sees no political benefit for the alleged murder of al-Hadi. The manner of his death is also given differently by sources.

More generally, Shia sources hold the Abbasids responsible in the deaths of multiple Shia Imams, not just al-Hadi. The silence of Sunni sources here is attributed by Shia authors to the atmosphere of fear and intimidation under the Abbasids. In particular, the Twelver traditionist Ibn Shahrashub said that he wrote his Manaqib ale Abi Talib "to bring forth what they [the Sunnis] have suppressed." There is also a tradition attributed to Muhammad al-Baqir, the fifth of the Twelve Imams, to the effect that none of them would escape an unjust death after attaining fame, except their last, whose birth would be concealed from the public. A similar tradition is ascribed to al-Rida, this time in response to a follower who had expressed his hope to see the Imam in power because "people have paid allegiance to" al-Rida and "coins have been struck" in his name.   

A brother of the caliph, named al-Muwaffaq, is said to have led the funeral prayer. The large number of mourners, however, forced the family to bring the body of al-Hadi back to the house, where he was then buried. The house was later expanded to a major shrine by various Shia and Sunni patrons. More recently, Naser al-Din Shah Qajar ordered to rebuild the complex in 1868-9 CE, and the golden dome was added in 1905 CE. The shrine also houses the tombs of his son, Hasan al-Askari, and his sister, Hakima Khatun. As an important destination for Shia pilgrimage, the shrine was bombed in February 2006 and badly damaged. Another attack was executed on 13 June 2007, which led to the destruction of the two minarets of the shrine. Authorities in Iraq hold al-Qaeda responsible for this attack.

Personal traits
Dwight M. Donaldson writes that al-Hadi comes across as a good-tempered, quiet man, who endured for years the hatred of al-Mutawakkil with dignity and patience. For Wardrop, the image of al-Hadi is Shia sources is that of a pacifist and persecuted Imam, who always remains unmoved by his enemies' attempts to humiliate and attack him. In these reports, she adds, al-Hadi maintains a detached and dignified pose in threatening situations, impressing upon others the certitude of his belief in the protection of God. The soldiers found him praying and he then helped them in their search. After this futile search and other episodes of disrespect and ridicule, al-Hadi again invokes the power of God in Shia sources rather than indulging in verbal attacks or enraged silence.

Imamate

Designation 
After the death of al-Jawad in 220 AH (835 CE), most of his followers acknowledged his son Ali as the next Imam. As with his father, Ali al-Hadi was still a minor when he succeeded to the imamate at the age of about seven. Thanks to the precedent of al-Jawad, however, the imamate of Ali was widely accepted without much demur, even though in both cases the inner circle of their predecessors must have played a visible role in consolidating their imamate. By this account, the designation was orally delivered to one Abu al-Khayrani by al-Jawad, who thus appointed his son Ali as his successor. Wardrop identifies this person as Ahmad ibn Hammad al-Marwazi, who was close to al-Jawad, while elsewhere he is named as Khayran al-Khadim, a servant of al-Jawad. At any rate, this Abu al-Khayrani then wrote to a few notable Imamite figures with the news of this designation, with instructions to open the letters if anything happened to him. The oral designation was also overheard by Ahmad ibn Muhammad ibn Isa, who happened to be there to inquire about the health of al-Jawad. When al-Jawad died, Ahmad met with Muhammad ibn al-Faraj al-Rukhaji and ten other unnamed Imamite figures and listened to Abu al-Khayrani. Of these, Ahmad was a reputable Qomi Imamite, while Muhammad was a representative of al-Jawad, who came to the forefront after his death. Indeed, the meeting took place at Muhammad's house and it was him who invited Abu al-Khayrani to the meeting. At the meeting, the claim of al-Khayrani was reluctantly corroborated by Ahmad, who said he preferred the honor to have gone to an Arab rather than a non-Arab. After some contemplation, the group accepted the imamate of Ali, the report concludes. More evidence is found in the will attributed to al-Jawad in Kitab al-Kafi, which stipulates that his son Ali would inherit from him and be responsible for his younger brother, Musa, and his sisters. For the Muslim jurist Hoessin Modarresi, this account suggests that the seniority of Ali over his brother was not sufficient and the Shia community had to be convinced that Ali was directly appointed by his father. A small group also gathered around Musa but soon returned to Ali al-Hadi after the former dissociated himself from them.

Representatives
Bernheimer considers the imamate of al-Hadi as a turning point for Shia because the direct leadership of the Shia community by the Imams effectively ended when al-Hadi was summoned in 233 AH (848 CE) to Samarra, where he was held under constant surveillance by the Abbasid caliphs until his death. Still, similar to his predecessors, al-Hadi secretly communicated with an underground network of representatives, who were responsible for the financial and religious affairs of the Imamite Shias, and particularly for the collection of religious dues, such as Khums. These agents gradually took over the function of guiding and organizing the Imamites, following the same principle of political quietism to which the Shia Imams adhered. There seems to have been four geographic areas; the first one included Baghdad, Mada'in, Sawad, and Kufa, the second area included Basra and Ahwaz, the third included Qom and Hamadan, and the fourth included Hejaz, Yemen, and Egypt. Each of these four areas was entrusted to an agent, who was also responsible for appointing local agents within his area. Nevertheless, there were waves of crackdowns by al-Mutawakkil in 235 AH (850 CE) and by al-Mastai'n in 248 AH (862 CE). Some of the arrested agents died under torture while others were imprisoned. Because of the underground nature of this network, there were also probably some who falsely claimed to represent al-Hadi in order to collect money from the Imamite Shias. A few of these agents of al-Hadi are listed below. 
 Uthman ibn Sa'id al-Asadi, who was a close associate of both al-Hadi and his son, Hasan al-Askari, according to the Twelver scholar Shaykh Tusi. Initially a servant in the residence of al-Hadi, he was appointed as an agent in Baghdad sometime during the reign of al-Muntasir or al-Musta'in. He continued to serve al-Askari and was later recognized as the first deputy of Muhammad al-Mahdi, the last Imam in Twelver Shia. His son Muhammad is considered to be the second deputy of al-Mahdi.
 Ali ibn Mahziar Ahwazi was the agent of al-Jawad and later al-Hadi in Ahwaz. He wrote two books, namely, Kitab al-Malahim and Kitab al-Qa'im, both about occultation, which is the Twelver belief that Muhammad al-Mahdi, son of al-Askari, is the eschatological Mahdi who is now concealed from the public. The two sons of Ali ibn Mahziar, named Ibrahim and Muhammad, later served in Ahwaz as the representatives of Muhammad al-Mahdi, the twelfth Imam.  describes a visit to al-Hadi by Ali and his brother Ibrahim in 228 AH (842-3 CE), which might signal that the Shia Imam had finally emerged by this time from his isolation under hostile Abbasid caretakers. Ali and his brother likely continued to represent al-Hadi after that, because Ibrahim's son reported the instructions of his father on his deathbed to deliver some money to Hafs ibn Amr, another representative in Baghdad.
 Ali ibn Bil'al was a well-respected representative of al-Hadi in Wasit, even though he was originally from Baghdad. He was also earlier a follower of al-Jawad and later a loyal supporter of al-Askari. Muhammad ibn Ahmad ibn Yahya transmitted from al-Hadi on the authority of Ali ibn Bil'al. 
 Ayyub ibn Nuh was a trusted agent of al-Hadi in Kufa. Since he handled large amounts of religious dues on behalf of al-Hadi, the people were apparently surprised to find out after his death that he had only left hundred-fifty dinars behind.
 Hasan ibn Rashid or Abu Ali ibn Rashid was a representative of al-Hadi in Baghdad, Mada'in, and Sawad. Hasan predeceased al-Hadi and was praised by him, "He [Hasan] lived content and died a martyr." A letter attributed to al-Hadi asks Hasan and Ayyub ibn Nuh to resolve their dispute and work only within their defined areas.
 Ali ibn Ja'far was a representative of al-Hadi. Suspecting this, al-Mutawakkil imprisoned him, initially for life, but he was later pardoned when the caliph declared a general amnesty, apparently hoping that this show of mercy would cure him of an illness. Ali was entrusted by al-Hadi and later al-Askari with large sums of money, which he spent at his discretion. The evidence is that al-Askari in a letter defended Ali ibn Ja'far against the accusations of 'reckless spending' by another Shia, Abu Tahir al-Balal. 
 Ahmad ibn Ishaq al-Ash'ari is recorded as a trustworthy associate of al-Jawad, al-Hadi, and particularly of al-Askari. He is said to have been a delegate from Qom to al-Askari. It is also said that al-Hadi paid Ahmad's debts worth thirty-thousand dinars. 
 Ibrahim ibn Muhammad al-Hamadani was the agent of al-Hadi in Hamadan and his descendants continued to serve the following Imams in the same capacity. 
 Isma'il ibn Ishaq ibn Nawbakht was an agent of al-Hadi in Baghdad. His family also served the Imam. In particular, a relative of him named al-Husayn ibn Ruh is recognized as the third deputy of the twelfth Imam, Muhammad al-Mahdi. 
 Muhammad ibn al-Faraj al-Rukhaji was a follower of al-Rida, and an agent of both al-Jawad and al-Hadi. He is also considered a trustworthy transmitter of hadiths in Shia. Indeed, he reported from al-Kazim and wrote the book  which was transmitted by Ahmad ibn Hilal. It was apparently at his house that Shia figures met after the death of al-Jawad and recognized the imamate of his son, al-Hadi. Later al-Hadi warned him in a letter about the hostility of al-Mutawakkil and Muhammad was soon enough jailed and his properties were confiscated. When he was released after eight years in prison, he asked al-Hadi for his help in restoring his possessions. The Imam responded warmly but also added that those properties would be of no benefit to Muhammad. Indeed, he soon died.

Miracles 
In Twelver Shia, al-Hadi is considered knowledgeable of the languages of the Persians, Slavs, Indians, and Nabataeans. In particular, al-Tabarsi writes that al-Hadi was articulate in seventy-three languages, probably in reference to a hadith, attributed to Muhammad, that his community would be split to seventy-three groups. This was not unique to al-Hadi, however, and miracles of speech are attributed to all Shia Imams. One of the many such accounts about al-Hadi is narrated by Ibrahim ibn Mahziyar, who describes a meeting with a young al-Hadi in 228 AH (842-3 CE) in the company of his brother Ali and their servant Masrur, whom al-Hadi sent for the following day and spoke to him in his native language of Persian. Ali al-Hadi is also credited in Twelver sources with predicting the death of al-Mutawakkil, who had either imprisoned or humiliated al-Hadi. Narrated by Ishaq ibn Abd-Allah al-Alawi, a distant relative of al-Hadi, the question was about the significance of fasting on the prophet's birthdate, the day he received his divine message, the day on which the earth was flattened, and the day of the Ghadir Khumm. On one occasion,  describes that the soldiers ordered to kill al-Hadi did not dare to harm him because of "his awe-inspiring presence," seeing around him a hundred raised swords. In the presence of al-Mutawakkil, al-Hadi debunked the claim of a woman who pretended to be Zaynab, daughter of Ali ibn Abi Talib. He did so by descending into the caliph's den of lions to prove that they do not harm true descendants of Ali ibn Abi Talib. This the woman refused to imitate. It is also said that al-Hadi brought to life a picture of a lion on a carpet, which then ate a juggler who had attempted to humiliate the Imam by his tricks, on the order of al-Mutawakkil. Another tradition states that he turned a handful of sand into gold for the poor. When he set out for Samarra, despite clear skies, al-Hadi prepared for heavy rain which indeed materialized in a few hours to the amazement of his escort.

Succession
Ali al-Hadi was survived by two sons, namely, Ja'far and Hasan. The latter was born in Medina to a freed slave, whose name is variously given in different sources as Hudayth, Susan, or Salil. After al-Hadi, the majority of his followers acknowledged as their next Imam his adult son Hasan, who is commonly known by the title al-Askari on account of his almost life-long detention under close surveillance in the garrison town of Samarra, after moving there with his father as a child. Imamite sources report that al-Hadi designated Hasan as his successor a month before his death in 254 AH (868 CE). This appointment came after the death of his eldest son Muhammad, whom some expected to be the next Imam. After the death of al-Hadi, his other son Ja'far unsuccessfully claimed the imamate for himself, and he is thus referred to as Ja'far al-Kadhab in the Imamite sources. Some apparently considered Ja'far particularly unfit for the position because of his poor reputation. The death of Muhammad and the poor reputation of Ja'far thus facilitated the accession of Hassan. Still, some considered al-Hadi to be the last Imam, which might have compelled Hasan to personally write to Imamite figures across the Abbasid empire to dispel their doubts. When al-Askari died ostensibly without an heir in 260 AH (874 CE), some more rejected his imamate because the Imam could not be childless, they argued. Among them, the now-extinct Muhammadites argued that Muhammad ibn Ali al-Hadi must have been the true eleventh Imam, even though he had predeceased his father. For them, Muhammad was the Mahdi, the messianic figure in Islam to (re)appear at the end of times to eradicate injustice and evil. Probably related to this group was Ibn Nusayr, who considered Ali al-Hadi to be divine and claimed to be his prophet. He is considered the founder of Nusayris, a now-extinct Ghali sect of Shia. The Ghulat believed in the divinity of the Shia Imams.

Ja'farites 
These accepted the imamate of Ja'far, the youngest son of al-Hadi, although they arrived at this claim differently. One faction turned to Ja'far after the death of his brother al-Askari in 260 AH (874 CE), who did not leave an obvious heir. Another group of Ja'farites believed that al-Askari himself had designated Ja'far as his successor, notable among them the Kufan theologian Ali ibn Tahi (or Talhi) al-Khazzaz. This Ali ranked among the Fathites, many of whom thus joined the Ja'farites. Yet another group held that Ja'far was directly designated by his father al-Hadi as his successor. Also a subgroup was the Nafisites, who believed that al-Hadi appointed Muhammad as the successor. He died in the lifetime of his father, but not before designating his brother Ja'far as his successor, they said. More specifically, they believed that Muhammad entrusted his testament to his servant Nafis, who passed it on to Ja'far. The latter thus claimed he was the successor to Muhammad. Nafis himself was killed. At the same time, some followers of Faris ibn Hatim ibn Mahawayh al-Qazvini claimed that Muhammad ibn Ali al-Hadi was the successor of al-Hadi, even though he died before his father. This was apparently an act of defiance to al-Askari, who had sided with his father al-Hadi when he excommunicated his erstwhile agent Faris for embezzling religious dues and openly inciting against him. Ali al-Hadi also introduced a curse on Faris and later called for his death. He was indeed assassinated during the imamate of al-Askari. The followers of Faris thus accepted the imamate of Ja'far instead of al-Askari. In any case, Ja'far soon died and some then turned to his descendants after him. The Ja'farites were nevertheless extinct by 373 AH (983-4 CE), as some converted to the mainstream Twelver Shia and some emigrated to Egypt or elsewhere and joined Sufi orders.

Works
A theological treatise on free will and some other short texts are ascribed to al-Hadi and quoted in Tuhaf al-uqul, a Twelver collection of hadiths. According to Mavani, most Shia hadiths about Khums (Islamic alms) are attributed to al-Hadi and his predecessor, al-Jawad. Some regard Khums as an example of the Imams’ discretionary authority as religious and temporal Shia leaders, which in this case countered the redirection of Zakat (another Islamic alms) "to sustain the oppressors [the caliphs] and to secure their affluent lifestyle," according to the Shia jurist Hussein-Ali Montazeri. One example is the response of al-Hadi to a letter from his new agent Hasan ibn Rashid, in which the former describes Khums as a levy on possessions and produce, and on traders and craftsmen, after they had provided for themselves. Donaldson quotes one of the prophetic traditions related on the authority of al-Hadi, through Ali ibn Abi Talib, which defines faith as contained in the hearts of men, confirmed by their deeds, whereas surrender is what the tongue expresses which only validates the union. Mavani quotes another hadith, ascribed to al-Hadi and transmitted by al-Tabarsi:

See also

Notes

Footnotes

References

 
 
 

 
 

 
 
 

 
 

 
 
 

 

 
 
 
 
 
 

 

 
 

 

 
 

 

 

828 births
868 deaths
9th-century Arabs
9th-century imams
9th-century people from the Abbasid Caliphate
Twelve Imams
Deaths by poisoning
Husaynids
People of Berber descent